Luis Patricio Núñez Blanco (born 20 January 1980) is a former Chilean footballer who played as a forward.

Núñez played internationally for one game of the Chile national football team in a game against Costa Rica prior to the 2007 Copa América. He played 28 minutes, coming off the bench in the 62nd minute, replacing to Humberto Suazo, in a 1–1 draw at the Estadio Fiscal de Talca.

Honours

Club
Universidad Católica
 Primera División de Chile (1): Runner-up 2007 Apertura

References

External links
 Luis Núñez at Football Lineups

1980 births
Living people
Footballers from Santiago
Chilean footballers
Association football forwards
Jacksonville Cyclones players
Magallanes footballers
Unión San Felipe footballers
Club Deportivo Universidad Católica footballers
Club Universitario de Deportes footballers
Club Deportivo Palestino footballers
Ñublense footballers
C.D. Universidad Católica del Ecuador footballers
O'Higgins F.C. footballers
C.D. Huachipato footballers
Deportes Concepción (Chile) footballers
A-League (1995–2004) players
Primera B de Chile players
Chilean Primera División players
Peruvian Primera División players
Ecuadorian Serie B players
Chile international footballers
Chilean expatriate footballers
Chilean expatriate sportspeople in the United States
Chilean expatriate sportspeople in Ecuador
Chilean expatriate sportspeople in Peru
Expatriate soccer players in the United States
Expatriate footballers in Ecuador
Expatriate footballers in Peru